Dzongkha Braille or Bhutanese Braille, is the braille alphabet for writing Dzongkha, the national language of Bhutan. It is based on English braille, with some extensions from international usage. As in print, the vowel a is not written.

Despite Dzongkha and Tibetan using nearly the same alphabet in print, the braille alphabets differ radically, with Tibetan Braille closer to German conventions and assigned letter values according to different sound correspondences.

Alphabet

The reversed letters used in Sanskrit loanwords are indicated with the diacritic : 
ཊ , ཋ , ཌ , ཎ , ཥ .

The vowel "a" is inherent in a consonant letter, and is not written explicitly.  Other vowels are written after a consonant as in English Braille.  When a vowel occurs at the beginning of a word, the vowel letter is carried by a null consonant ཨ :

Sanskrit vowel-marking includes:
 ཨཿ aḥ,  ཨྃ aṃ, 
as in ཀིཿ  kiḥ, ཀོྃ  koṃ. 

It's not clear how conjuncts are indicated.  However, the conjunct ཀྵ  kṣa in Sanskrit loans suggests that the 45 points  conjoin two consonants.

Punctuation
Digits are as in English Braille.  Native punctuation (syllable divider, comma, stop) is:

Roman punctuation differs from that of English Braille.

References

French-ordered braille alphabets
Tibetan language